InterExchange is a non-profit organization and a J-1 visa sponsor designated by the U.S. Department of State. The company manages cultural exchange programs for participants from more than 60 countries who work in the U.S. in short-term positions lasting 4 to 18 months, and for Americans who work and volunteer abroad. Paul and Uta Christianson founded the organization under the name International Student Visitor Services (ISVS) in 1968.

InterExchange programs include Au Pair USA, Camp USA, Career Training USA, Work & Travel USA, and Working Abroad. InterExchange also provides grants through its Foundation.

InterExchange is a member of several international cultural exchange organizations including The Alliance for International Exchange, the World Youth Student & Educational Travel Confederation, WYSE Work Abroad, and the International Au Pair Association.

Au Pair USA
InterExchange has run the Au Pair USA, program since 1989. The program matches American host families with international au pairs for 12 months. In exchange for child care services, the au pairs receive room and board and a stipend during their stays in the U.S.

Camp USA
The Camp USA program places international students and young adults in camp counselor and support staff positions at American summer camps. The Camp Counselor J-1 Visa is a 4-month visa from May to September with an optional 30 days of travel after the camp placement.

Career Training USA
The Career Training USA program helps connect international students, recent graduates and young professionals to internships related to their areas of academic study and to profession-specific training programs in the United States.  Internships and training programs can last up to 18 months, depending on the industry.

Work & Travel USA
The Work & Travel USA program helps connect international students with short-term, seasonal positions in the U.S. Participants can live and work in the U.S. for up to 4 months during their academic breaks. A 12-month program is also available to citizens of Australia and New Zealand.  Participants are allowed to travel in the U.S. for up to 30 days after their work assignments are completed.

Working Abroad (U.S. Outbound Programs)
The Working Abroad programs enable U.S. citizens to engage in work or volunteer opportunities overseas. InterExchange programs include Au Pair, Teaching English, Volunteer, and Work & Travel. InterExchange offers programs in Africa, Asia, Australasia, Europe, and South America.

InterExchange Foundation
The InterExchange Foundation was established in 2007 to provide grants of up to $10,000 in value to Americans who contribute to humanitarian work or volunteer abroad projects in other countries. 

 The Working Abroad Alumni Grant is awarded to InterExchange Working Abroad program participants. 
 The Christianson Grant is awarded to individuals who have arranged their own work or volunteer abroad programs.
 The Community Impact Grant is awarded to U.S. citizens on an InterExchange Work Abroad program who devise or improve a community project that will positively impact their host community.

References

External links

U.S. Department of State: Exchange Visitor Visas
The Alliance for International Educational and Cultural Exchange
IAPA

Non-profit organizations based in New York City
Organizations established in 1968
Cultural exchange
Cultural promotion organizations